Yuri Sergeyevich Mitrokhin (born 10 October 1997) is a Russian football player.

Club career
He made his debut in the Russian Professional Football League for FC Kuban-2 Krasnodar on 28 July 2016 in a game against FC Spartak Vladikavkaz.

He made his debut for the main squad of FC Kuban Krasnodar on 24 August 2016 in a Russian Cup game against FC Energomash Belgorod.

References

External links
 
 Profile by Russian Professional Football League

1997 births
Sportspeople from Krasnodar
Living people
Russian footballers
Association football midfielders
FC Kuban Krasnodar players
FC Urozhay Krasnodar players